Utharamangalam is a village in the Papanasam taluk of Thanjavur district, Tamil Nadu, India.

Demographics 

As per the 2001 census, Utharamangalam had a total population of 639 with 301 males and 338 females. The sex ratio was 1123. The literacy rate was 55.64.

References 

 

Villages in Thanjavur district